Johnston Atoll is an unincorporated territory of the United States, currently administered by the United States Fish and Wildlife Service (USFWS). Johnston Atoll is a National Wildlife Refuge and part of the Pacific Remote Islands Marine National Monument. It is closed to public entry, and limited access for management needs is only granted by Letter of Authorization from the United States Air Force and a Special Use Permit from the U.S. Fish and Wildlife Service.

For nearly 70 years, the isolated atoll was under the control of the U.S. military. During that time, it was variously used as a naval refueling depot, an airbase, a testing site for nuclear and biological weapons, a secret missile base, and a site for the storage and disposal of chemical weapons and Agent Orange. Those activities left the area environmentally contaminated, and monitoring continues.

The island is home to thriving communities of nesting seabirds and has significant marine biodiversity. USFWS teams carry out environmental monitoring and maintenance to protect the native wildlife.

Geography

The atoll, which is located on a coral reef platform, has four islands. Johnston Island and Sand Island are both enlarged natural features, while Akau (North) and Hikina (East) are two artificial islands formed by coral dredging.

Due to the atoll's tilt, much of the reef on the southeast portion has subsided.

The climate is tropical but generally dry. Northeast trade winds are consistent and there is little seasonal temperature variation.

Climate

Wildlife 
About 300 species of fish have been recorded from the reefs and inshore waters of the atoll. It is also visited by green turtles and Hawaiian monk seals. The possibility of humpback whales using the waters as a breeding ground has been suggested, albeit in small numbers and with irregular occurrences so far. Many other cetaceans possibly migrate through the area, but the species being most notably confirmed is Cuvier's beaked whales.

Birds
Seabird species recorded as breeding on the atoll include Bulwer's petrel, wedge-tailed shearwater, Christmas shearwater, white-tailed tropicbird, red-tailed tropicbird, brown booby, red-footed booby, masked booby, great frigatebird, spectacled tern, sooty tern, brown noddy, black noddy, and white tern. It is the world's largest colony of red-tailed tropicbirds, with 10,800 nests in 2020. It is visited by migratory shorebirds, including the Pacific golden plover, wandering tattler, bristle-thighed curlew, ruddy turnstone and sanderling. The island, with its surrounding marine waters, has been recognised as an Important Bird Area by BirdLife International for its seabird colonies.

Flora
The first list of plants catalogued on Johnston Atoll was published in 1931 in Vascular Plants of Johnston and Wake Islands based on collections of the Tanager Expedition on in 1923. Three species were described Lepturus repens, Boerhavia diffusa, and Tribulus cistoides. In the 1930s when the island was used for aviation activities for the war, Pluchea odorata was introduced from Honolulu.

History

Early history
The first Western record of the atoll was on September 2, 1796, when the Boston-based American brig Sally accidentally grounded on a shoal near the islands. The ship's captain, Joseph Pierpont, published his experience in several American newspapers the following year giving an accurate position of Johnston and Sand Island along with part of the reef, but did not name or lay claim to the area. The islands were not officially named until Captain Charles J. Johnston of the Royal Naval ship  sighted them on December 14, 1807. The ship's journal recorded: "on the 14th [December 1808] made a new discovery, viz. two very low islands, in lat. 16° 52′ N. long. 190° 26′ E., having a dangerous reef to the east of them, and the whole not exceeding four miles in extent".

In 1856, the United States enacted the Guano Islands Act, which allowed citizens of the United States to take possession of islands containing guano deposits. Under this act, William Parker and R. F. Ryan chartered the schooner Palestine specifically to find Johnston Atoll. They located guano on the atoll in March 1858 and proceeded to claim the island as U.S. territory. In June of the same year, S. C. Allen, sailing on the Kalama under a commission from King Kamehameha IV of Hawaii, landed on Johnston Atoll, removed the American flag, and claimed the atoll for the Kingdom of Hawaii. Allen named the atoll "Kalama" and the nearby smaller island "Cornwallis."

Returning on July 27, 1858, the captain of the Palestine again hoisted the American flag and tried to acquire the island in the name of the United States. The same day, the "derelict and abandoned" atoll was declared part of the domain of Kamehameha IV. On its July visit, however, the Palestine left two crew members on the island to gather phosphate. Later that year, Kamehameha revoked the lease granted to Allen when he learned the atoll had been claimed previously by the United States. However, this did not prevent the Hawaiian Territory from making use of the atoll or asserting ownership.

By 1890, the atoll's guano deposits had been almost entirely depleted (mined out) by U.S. interests operating under the Guano Islands Act. In 1892,  made a survey and map of the island, hoping that it might be suitable as a telegraph cable station. On January 16, 1893, the Hawaiian Legation at London reported a diplomatic conference over this temporary occupation of the island. However, the Kingdom of Hawaii was overthrown on January 17, 1893. When Hawaii was annexed by the United States in 1898, during the Spanish–American War, the name of Johnston Island was omitted from the list of Hawaiian Islands. On September 11, 1909, Johnston was leased by the Territory of Hawaii to a private citizen for fifteen years. A board shed was built on the southeast side of the larger island, and a small tramline run up onto the slope of the low hill, to facilitate the removal of guano. Apparently neither the quantity nor the quality of the guano was sufficient to pay for gathering it, so that the project was soon abandoned.

National Wildlife Refuge since 1926

The Tanager Expedition was a joint expedition, sponsored by the U.S. Department of Agriculture and the Bishop Museum of Hawaii, which visited the Atoll in 1923. Aerial survey and mapping flights over Johnston were conducted with a Douglas DT-2 floatplane carried on her fantail, which was hoisted into the water for takeoff. From July 10–22, 1923, the atoll was recorded in a pioneering aerial photography project. The  left Honolulu on July 16 and joined up with the Whippoorwill to complete the survey and then traveled to Wake Island to complete surveys there. Tents were pitched on the southwest beach of fine white sand, and a rather thorough biological survey was made of the island. Hundreds of sea birds, of a dozen kinds, were the principal inhabitants, together with lizards, insects, and hermit crabs. The reefs and shallow water abounded with fish and other marine life.

Johnston Atoll was added to the United States National Wildlife Refuge system in 1926, and renamed the Johnston Island National Wildlife Refuge in 1940. The Johnston Atoll National Wildlife Refuge was established to protect the tropical ecosystem and the wildlife that it harbors.

On February 14, 1941, President Franklin Roosevelt issued  to create naval defense areas in the central Pacific territories. The proclamation established "Johnston Island Naval Defensive Sea Area" which encompassed the territorial waters between the extreme high-water marks and the three-mile marine boundaries surrounding the atoll. "Johnston Island Naval Airspace Reservation" was also established to restrict access to the airspace over the naval defense sea area. Only U.S. government ships and aircraft were permitted to enter the naval defense areas at Johnston unless authorized by the Secretary of the Navy.

In 1990, two full-time U.S. Fish and Wildlife Service personnel, a Refuge Manager and a biologist, were stationed on Johnston Atoll to handle the increase in biological, contaminant, and resource conflict activities.
 
After the military mission on the island ended in 2004, the Atoll was administered by the Pacific Remote Islands National Wildlife Refuge Complex. The outer islets and water rights were managed cooperatively by the Fish and Wildlife Service, with some of the actual Johnston Island land mass remaining under control of the United States Air Force (USAF) for environmental remediation and the Defense Threat Reduction Agency (DTRA) for plutonium cleanup purposes. However, on January 6, 2009, under authority of section 2 of the Antiquities Act, the Pacific Remote Islands Marine National Monument was established by President George W. Bush to administer and protect Johnston Island along with six other Pacific islands. The Administration of President  Barack Obama in 2014 extended the protected area to encompass the entire Exclusive Economic Zone, by banning all commercial fishing activities. Under a 2017 review of all national monuments extended since 1996, then-Secretary of the Interior Ryan Zinke recommended to permit fishing outside the 12-mile limit.

Military control 1934–2004
On December 29, 1934, President Franklin D. Roosevelt with  transferred control of Johnston Atoll to the United States Navy under the 14th Naval District, Pearl Harbor, in order to establish an air station, and also to the Department of the Interior to administer the bird refuge. In 1948, the USAF assumed control of the Atoll.

During the Operation Hardtack nuclear test series from April 22 to August 19, 1958, administration of Johnston Atoll was assigned to the Commander of Joint Task Force 7. After the tests were completed, the island reverted to the command of the US Air Force.

From 1963 to 1970, the Navy's Joint Task force 8 and the Atomic Energy Commission (AEC) held joint operational control of the island during high-altitude nuclear testing operations.

In 1970, operational control was handed back to the Air Force until July 1973, when Defense Special Weapons Agency was given host-management responsibility by the Secretary of Defense. Over the years, sequential descendant organizations have been the Defense Atomic Support Agency (DASA) from 1959 to 1971, the Defense Nuclear Agency (DNA) from 1971 to 1996, and the Defense Special Weapons Agency (DSWA) from 1996 to 1998. In 1998, Defense Special Weapons Agency, and selected elements of the Office of Secretary of Defense were combined to form the Defense Threat Reduction Agency (DTRA). In 1999, host-management responsibility transferred from the Defense Threat Reduction Agency once again to the Air Force until the Air Force mission ended in 2004 and the base was closed.

Sand Island seaplane base

In 1935, personnel from the US Navy's Patrol Wing Two carried out some minor construction to develop the atoll for seaplane operation. In 1936, the Navy began the first of many changes to enlarge the atoll's land area. They erected some buildings and a boat landing on Sand Island and blasted coral to clear a  seaplane landing. Several seaplanes made flights from Hawaii to Johnston, such as that of a squadron of six aircraft in November, 1935.

In November 1939, further work was commenced on Sand Island by civilian contractors to allow the operation of one squadron of patrol planes with tender support. Part of the lagoon was dredged and the excavated material was used to make a parking area connected by a  causeway to Sand Island. Sand Island had barracks built for 400 men, a mess hall, underground hospital, radio station, water tanks and a  steel control tower. In December 1943 an additional  of parking was added to the seaplane base.

On May 26, 1942, a United States Navy Consolidated PBY-5 Catalina wrecked at Johnston Atoll. The Catalina pilot made a normal power landing and immediately applied throttle for take-off. At a speed of about fifty knots the plane swerved to the left and then continued into a violent waterloop. The hull of the plane was broken open and the Catalina sank immediately.

After the war on March 27, 1949, a PBY-6A Catalina had to make a forced landing during flight from Kwajalein to Johnston Island. The plane was damaged beyond repair and the crew of 11 was rescued nine hours later by a Navy ship which sank the plane by gunfire.

During 1958, a proposed support agreement for Navy Seaplane operations at Johnston Island was under discussion though it was never completed because a requirement for the operation failed to materialize.

Airfield

By September 1941, construction of an airfield on Johnston Island commenced. A  by  runway was built together with two 400-man barracks, two mess halls, a cold-storage building, an underground hospital, a fresh-water plant, shop buildings, and fuel storage. The runway was subsequently lengthened and improved as the island was enlarged.

During World War II Johnston Atoll was used as a refueling base for submarines, and also as an aircraft refueling stop for American bombers transiting the Pacific Ocean, including the Boeing B-29 Enola Gay. By 1944, the atoll was one of the busiest air transport terminals in the Pacific. Air Transport Command aeromedical evacuation planes stopped at Johnston en route to Hawaii. Following V-J Day on August 14, 1945, Johnston Atoll saw the flow of men and aircraft that had been coming from the mainland into the Pacific turn around. By 1947, over 1,300 B-29 and B-24 bombers had passed through the Marianas, Kwajalein, Johnston Island, and Oahu en route to Mather Field and civilian life.

Following World War II, Johnston Atoll Airport was used commercially by Continental Air Micronesia, touching down between Honolulu and Majuro. When aircraft landed, soldiers surrounded the aircraft and passengers were not allowed to leave the aircraft. Aloha Airlines also made weekly scheduled flights to the island carrying civilian and military personnel; in the 1990s there were flights almost daily, and some days saw up to three arrivals. Just before movement of the chemical munitions to Johnston Atoll, the Surgeon General, Public Health Service, reviewed the shipment and the Johnston Atoll storage plans. His recommendations caused the Secretary of Defense in December 1970 to issue instructions suspending missile launches and all non-essential aircraft flights. As a result, Air Micronesia service was immediately discontinued, and missile firings were terminated with the exception of two 1975 satellite launches deemed critical to the island's mission.
 
There were many times when the runway was needed for emergency landings for both civil and military aircraft. When the runway was decommissioned, it could no longer be used as a potential emergency landing place when planning flight routes across the Pacific Ocean. As of 2003, the airfield at Johnston Atoll consisted of an unmaintained closed single  asphalt/concrete runway 5/23, a parallel taxiway, and a large paved ramp along the southeast side of the runway.

World War II 1941–1945
 In February 1941 Johnston Atoll was designated as a Naval Defensive Sea Area and Airspace Reservation. On the day the Japanese struck Pearl Harbor, December 7, 1941,  was out of her home port of Pearl Harbor, to make a simulated bombardment at Johnston Island. Japan's strike at Pearl Harbor occurred as the ship was unloading marines, civilians and stores on the atoll. On December 15, 1941, the atoll was shelled outside the reef by a Japanese submarine, which had been part of the attack on Pearl Harbor eight days earlier. Several buildings including the power station were hit, but no personnel were injured. Additional Japanese shelling occurred on December 22 and 23, 1941. On all occasions, Johnston Atoll's coastal artillery guns returned fire, driving off the sub.

In July 1942, the civilian contractors at the atoll were replaced by 500 men from the 5th and 10th Naval Construction Battalions, who expanded the fuel storage and water production at the base and built additional facilities. The 5th Battalion departed in January 1943.

Coast Guard mission 1957–1992

On January 25, 1957, the Department of Treasury was granted a 5-year permit for the United States Coast Guard (USCG) to operate and maintain a Long Range Aid to Navigation (LORAN) transmitting station on Johnston Atoll. Two years later in December 1959, the Secretary of Defense approved the Secretary of the Treasury's request to use Sand Island for U.S. Coast Guard LORAN A and C station sites. The USCG was granted permission to install a LORAN A and C station on Sand Island to be staffed by U.S. Coast Guard personnel through June 30, 1992. The permit for a LORAN station to operate on Johnston Island was terminated in 1962. On November 1, 1957, a new United States Coast Guard LORAN-A station was commissioned. By 1958, the Coast Guard LORAN Station at Johnston Island began transmitting on a 24-hour basis, thus establishing a new LORAN rate in the Central Pacific. The new rate between Johnston Island and French Frigate Shoals gave a higher order of accuracy for fixing positions in the steamship lanes from Oahu, Hawaii, to Midway Island. In the past, this was impossible in some areas along this important shipping route. The original U.S. Coast Guard LORAN-A Station on Johnston Island ceased operations on June 30, 1961, when the new station on nearby Sand Island began transmitting using a larger 180 foot antenna.

The LORAN-C station was disestablished on July 1, 1992, and all Coast Guard personnel, electronic equipment, and property departed the atoll that month. Buildings on Sand Island were transferred to other activities. LORAN whip antennas on Johnston and Sand Islands were removed, and the 625-foot LORAN tower and antenna were demolished on December 3, 1992. The LORAN A and C station and buildings on Sand Island were then dismantled and removed.

National nuclear weapon test site 1958–1963

Successes
Between 1958 and 1975, Johnston Atoll was used as an American national nuclear test site for atmospheric and extremely high-altitude nuclear explosions in outer space. In 1958, Johnston Atoll was the location of the two "Hardtack I" nuclear tests firings. One conducted August 1, 1958, was codenamed "Hardtack Teak" and one conducted August 12, 1958, was codenamed "Orange." Both tests detonated 3.8-megaton hydrogen bombs launched to high altitudes by rockets from Johnston Atoll.

These carried scientific instruments and telemetry equipment, either in support of the nuclear bomb tests, or in experimental antisatellite technology.

Eight PGM-17 Thor missiles deployed by the U.S. Air Force (USAF) were launched from Johnston Island in 1962 as part of "Operation Fishbowl," a part of "Operation Dominic" nuclear weapons tests in the Pacific. The first launch in "Operation Fishbowl" was a successful research and development launch with no warhead. In the end, "Operation Fishbowl" produced four successful high-altitude detonations: "Starfish Prime," "Checkmate," "Bluegill Triple Prime," and "Kingfish." In addition, it produced one atmospheric nuclear explosion, "Tightrope."

It created a very brief fireball visible over a wide area, plus bright artificial auroras visible in Hawaii for several minutes. "Starfish Prime" also produced an electromagnetic pulse that disrupted some electric power and communication systems in Hawaii. It pumped enough radiation into the Van Allen belts to destroy or damage seven satellites in orbit.

The final Fishbowl launch that used a Thor missile carried the "Kingfish" 400-kiloton warhead up to its  detonation altitude. Although it was officially one of the Operation Fishbowl tests, it is sometimes not listed among high-altitude nuclear tests because of its lower detonation altitude. "Tightrope" was the final test of Operation Fishbowl and detonated on November 3, 1962. It launched on a nuclear-armed Nike-Hercules missile and was detonated at a lower altitude than the other tests:

"At Johnston Island, there was an intense white flash. Even with high-density goggles, the burst was too bright to view, even for a few seconds. A distinct thermal pulse was felt on bare skin. A yellow-orange disc was formed, and transformed itself into a purple doughnut. A glowing purple cloud was faintly visible for a few minutes." The nuclear yield was reported in most official documents as "less than 20 kilotons." One report by the U.S. government reported the yield of the "Tightrope" test as 10 kilotons. Seven sounding rockets were launched from Johnston Island in support of the Tightrope test, and this was the final American nuclear atmospheric test.

Failures

The "Fishbowl" series included four failures, all of which were deliberately disrupted by range safety officers when the missiles' systems failed during launch and were aborted. The second launch of the Fishbowl series, "Bluegill", carried an active warhead. Bluegill was "lost" by a defective range safety tracking radar and had to be destroyed 10 minutes after liftoff even though it probably ascended successfully. The subsequent nuclear weapon launch failures from Johnston Atoll caused serious contamination to the island and surrounding areas with weapons-grade plutonium and americium that remains an issue to this day.

The failure of the "Bluegill" launch created in effect a dirty bomb but did not release the nuclear warhead's plutonium debris onto Johnston Atoll as the missile fell into the ocean south of the island and was not recovered. However, the "Starfish", "Bluegill Prime", and "Bluegill Double Prime" test launch failures in 1962 scattered radioactive debris over Johnston Island contaminating it, the lagoon, and Sand Island with plutonium for decades.

"Starfish", a high altitude Thor launched nuclear test scheduled for June 20, 1962, was the first to contaminate the atoll. The rocket with the 1.45-megaton Starfish device (W49 warhead and the MK-4 re-entry vehicle) on its nose was launched that evening, but the Thor missile engine cut out only 59 seconds after launch. The range safety officer sent a destruct signal 65 seconds after launch, and the missile was destroyed at approximately  altitude. The warhead high explosive detonated in 1-point safe fashion, destroying the warhead without producing nuclear yield. Large pieces of the plutonium contaminated missile, including pieces of the warhead, booster rocket, engine, re-entry vehicle and missile parts, fell back on Johnston Island. More wreckage along with plutonium contamination was found on nearby Sand Island.

"Bluegill Prime," the second attempt to launch the payload which failed last time was scheduled for 23:15 (local) on July 25, 1962. It too was a genuine disaster and caused the most serious plutonium contamination on the island. The Thor missile was carrying one pod, two re-entry vehicles and the W50 nuclear warhead. The missile engine malfunctioned immediately after ignition, and the range safety officer fired the destruct system while the missile was still on the launch pad. The Johnston Island launch complex was demolished in the subsequent explosions and fire which burned through the night. The launch emplacement and portions of the island were contaminated with radioactive plutonium spread by the explosion, fire and wind-blown smoke.

Afterward, the Johnston Island launch complex was heavily damaged and contaminated with plutonium. Missile launches and nuclear testing halted until the radioactive debris was dumped and soils were recovered and the launch emplacement rebuilt. Three months of repairs, decontamination, and rebuilding the LE1 as well as the backup pad LE2 were necessary before tests could resume. In an effort to continue with the testing program, U.S. troops were sent in to do a rapid cleanup. The troops scrubbed down the revetments and launch pad, carted away debris and removed the top layer of coral around the contaminated launch pad. The plutonium-contaminated rubbish was dumped in the lagoon, polluting the surrounding marine environment. More than 550 drums of contaminated material were dumped in the ocean off Johnston from 1964 to 1965. At the time of the Bluegill Prime disaster, the top fill around the launch pad was scraped by a bulldozer and grader. It was then dumped into the lagoon to make a ramp, so the rest of the debris could be loaded onto landing craft to be dumped out into the ocean. An estimated 10 percent of the plutonium from the test device was in the fill used to make the ramp. Then the ramp was covered and placed into a  landfill on the island during 1962 dredging to extend the island.

On October 15, 1962, the "Bluegill Double Prime" test also misfired. During the test, the rocket was destroyed at a height of 109,000 feet after it malfunctioned 90 seconds into the flight. U.S. Defense Department officials confirm that when the rocket was destroyed, it contributed to the radioactive pollution on the island.

In 1963, the U.S. Senate ratified the Limited Test Ban Treaty, which contained a provision known as "Safeguard C". Safeguard C was the basis for maintaining Johnston Atoll as a "ready to test" above-ground nuclear testing site should atmospheric nuclear testing ever be deemed to be necessary again. In 1993, Congress appropriated no funds for the Johnston Atoll "Safeguard C" mission, bringing it to an end.

Anti-satellite mission 1962–1975

Program 437 turned the PGM-17 Thor into an operational anti-satellite (ASAT) weapon system, a capability that was kept top secret even after it was deployed. The Program 437 mission was approved for development by U.S. Secretary of Defense Robert McNamara on November 20, 1962, and based at the Atoll. Program 437 used modified Thor missiles that had been returned from deployment in Great Britain and was the second deployed U.S. operational nuclear anti-satellite operation. Eighteen more suborbital Thor launches took place from Johnston Island during the 1964–1975 period in support of Program 437. In 1965–1966 four Program 437 Thors were launched with 'Alternate Payloads' for satellite inspection. This was evidently an elaboration of the system to allow visual verification of the target before destroying it. These flights may have been related to the late 1960s Program 922, a non-nuclear version of Thor with infrared homing and a high-explosive warhead. Thors were kept positioned and active near the two Johnston Island launch pads after 1964. However, partly because of the Vietnam War, in October 1970 the Department of Defense had transferred Program 437 to standby status as an economic measure. The Strategic Arms Limitation Talks led to Anti-Ballistic Missile Treaty that prohibited 'interference with national means of verification', which meant that ASAT's were not allowed, by treaty, to attack Russian spy satellites. Thors were removed from Johnston Atoll and were stored in mothballed war-reserve condition at Vandenberg Air Force Base from 1970 until the anti-satellite mission of Johnston Island facilities was ceased on August 10, 1974, and the program was officially discontinued on April 1, 1975, when any possibility of restoring the ASAT program was finally terminated. Eighteen Thor launches in support of the Program 437 Alternate Payload (AP) mission took place from Johnston Atoll's Launch emplacements.

Baker–Nunn satellite tracking camera station

The Space Detection and Tracking System or SPADATS was operated by North American Aerospace Defense Command (NORAD) along with the U.S. Air Force Spacetrack system, The Navy Space Surveillance System and Canadian Forces Air Defense Command Satellite Tracking Unit. The Smithsonian Astrophysical Observatory also operated a dozen 3.5 ton Baker-Nunn Camera systems (none at Johnston) for cataloging of man-made satellites. The U.S. Air Force had ten Baker-Nunn camera stations around the world mostly from 1960 to 1977 with a phase-out beginning in 1964.

The Baker-Nunn space camera station was constructed on Sand Island and was functioning by 1965. USAF 18th Surveillance Squadron operated the Baker-Nunn camera at a station built along the causeway on Sand Island until 1975 when a contract to operate the four remaining Air Force stations was awarded to Bendix Field Engineering Corporation. In about 1977, the camera at Sand Island was moved to Daegu, South Korea. Baker-Nunn were rendered obsolete with the Initial Operational Capability of 3 GEODSS optical tracking sites at Daegu, Korea; Mount Haleakala, Maui and White Sands Missile Range. A fourth site was operational in 1985 at Diego Garcia and a proposed fifth site in Portugal was cancelled. The Daegu, Korea site was closed due to encroaching city lights. GEODSS tracked satellites at night, though the MIT Lincoln Laboratory test site, co-located with Site 1 at White Sands did track asteroids in daytime as proof of concept in the early 1980s.

Johnston Island Recovery Operations Center

Satellite and Missile Observation System Project (SAMOS-E) or "E-6" was a relatively short-lived series of United States visual reconnaissance satellites in the early 1960s. SAMOS was also known by the unclassified terms Program 101 and Program 201. The Air Force program was used as a cover for the initial development of the Central Intelligence Agency's Key Hole (including Corona and Gambit) reconnaissance satellites systems. Imaging was performed with film cameras and television surveillance from polar low Earth orbits with film canisters returning via capsule and parachute with mid-air retrieval. SAMOS was first launched in 1960, but not operational until 1963 with all of the missions being launched from Vandenberg AFB.

During the early months of the SAMOS program it was essential not only to hide the Corona and GAMBIT technical efforts under a screen of SAMOS activity, but also to make the orbital vehicle portions of the two systems resemble one another in outward appearance. Thus, some of the configuration details of SAMOS were decided less by engineering logic than by the need to camouflage GAMBIT and thus, in theory, a GAMBIT could be launched without alerting many people to its real nature.
Problems relative to tracking networks, communications, and recovery were resolved with the decision in late February 1961 to use Johnston Island as the film capsule descent and recovery zone for the program.
On July 10, 1961, work was initiated on four buildings of the Johnston Island Recovery Operations Center for the National Reconnaissance Office. Men from the Johnston Atoll facility would recover the parachuting film canister capsules with a radar equipped JC-130 aircraft by capturing them in the air with a specialized recovery apparatus.
The recovery center was also responsible for collecting the radioactive scientific data pods dropped from missiles following launch and nuclear detonation.

Biological warfare test site 1965–1968

The atoll was subject to large-scale bioweapons testing over four years starting in 1965. The American strategic tests of bioweapons were as expensive and elaborate as the tests of the first hydrogen bombs at Eniwetok Atoll. They involved enough ships to have made the world's fifth-largest independent navy. One experiment involved a number of barges loaded with hundreds of rhesus monkeys. It is estimated that one jet with bioweapon spray "would probably be more efficient at causing human deaths than a ten-megaton hydrogen bomb."

In the lead up to biological warfare testing in the Pacific under Project 112 and Project SHAD, a new virus was discovered during the Pacific Ocean Biological Survey Program by teams from the Smithsonian's Division of Birds aboard a United States Army tugboat involved in the program. Initially, the name of that effort was to be called the Pacific Ornithological Observation Project but this was changed for obvious reasons. First isolated in 1964 the tick-borne virus was discovered in Ornithodoros capensis ticks, found in a nest of common noddy (Anous stolidus) at Sand Island, Johnston Atoll. It was designated Johnston Atoll Virus and is related to influenza.

Test DTC 64-4 (Deseret Test Center) was originally called "RED BEVA" (Biological EVAluation) though the name was later changed to "Shady Grove", likely for operational security reasons. The biological agents released during this test included Francisella tularensis (formerly called Pasteurella tularensis) (Agent UL), the causative agent of tularemia; Coxiella burnetii (Agent OU), causative agent of Q fever; and Bacillus globigii (Agent BG). During Project SHAD, Bacillus globigii was used to simulate biological warfare agents (such as anthrax), because it was then considered a contaminant with little health consequence to humans; however, it is now considered a human pathogen. Ships equipped with the E-2 multi-head disseminator and A-4C aircraft equipped with Aero 14B spray tanks released live pathogenic agents in nine aerial and four surface trials in phase B of the test series from February 12 to March 15, 1965, and in four aerial trials in phase D of the test series from March 22 to April 3, 1965.

According to Project SHAD veteran Jack Alderson who commanded the Army tugs, area three at Johnston Atoll was located at the most downwind part of the island and consisted of an collapsible Nissen hut to be used for weapons preparation and some communications.

Chemical weapon storage 1971–2001

In 1970, Congress redefined the island's military mission as the storage and destruction of chemical weapons. The United States Army leased  on the Atoll to store chemical weapons held in Okinawa, Japan. Johnston Atoll became a chemical weapons storage site in 1971 holding about 6.6 percent of the U.S. military chemical weapon arsenal. The chemical weapons were brought from Okinawa under Operation Red Hat with the re-deployment of the 267th Chemical Company and consisted of rockets, mines, artillery projectiles, and bulk 1-ton containers filled with Sarin, Agent VX, vomiting agent, and blister agent such as mustard gas. Chemical weapons from West Germany and World War II era weapons from the Solomon Islands were also stored on the island after 1990. Chemical agents were stored in the high security Red Hat Storage Area (RHSA) which included hardened igloos in the weapon storage area, the Red Hat building (#850), two Red Hat hazardous waste warehouses (#851 and #852), an open storage area, and security entrances and guard towers.

Some of the other weapons stored at the site were shipped from U.S. stockpiles in West Germany in 1990. These shipments followed a 1986 agreement between the U.S. and West Germany to move the munitions. Merchant ships carrying the munitions left West Germany under Operation Golden Python and Operation Steel Box in October 1990 and arrived at Johnston Island November 6, 1990. Although the ships were unloaded within nine days, the unpacking and storing of munitions continued into 1991. The remainder of the chemical weapons was a small number of World War II era weapons shipped from the Solomon Islands.

Agent Orange storage 1972–1977

Agent Orange was brought to Johnston Atoll from South Vietnam and Gulfport, Mississippi in 1972 under Operation Pacer IVY. It was stored on the northwest corner of the island known as the Herbicide Orange Storage site, dubbed the "Agent Orange Yard". The Agent Orange was eventually destroyed during Operation Pacer HO on the Dutch incineration ship MT Vulcanus in the Summer of 1977. The U.S. Environmental Protection Agency (EPA) reported that 1,800,000 gallons of Herbicide Orange were stored at Johnston Atoll, and that an additional 480,000 gallons stored at Gulfport, Mississippi, was brought to Johnston Atoll for destruction. Leaking barrels during storage, and spills during re-drumming operations, contaminated both the storage area and the lagoon with herbicide residue and its toxic contaminant 2,3,7,8-Tetrachlorodibenzodioxin.

Chemical weapon demilitarization mission 1990–2000

The Army's Johnston Atoll Chemical Agent Disposal System (JACADS) was the first full-scale chemical weapons disposal facility. Built to incinerate chemical munitions on the island, planning started in 1981, construction began in 1985, and it was completed five years later. Following completion of construction and facility characterization, JACADS began operational verification testing (OVT) in June 1990. From 1990 until 1993, the Army conducted four planned periods of Operational Verification Testing (OVT), required by Public Law 100–456. OVT was completed in March 1993, having demonstrated that the reverse assembly incineration technology was effective, and that JACADS operations met all environmental parameters. Transition to full-scale operations started in May 1993, but the facility did not begin full-scale operations until August 1993.

All of the chemical weapons once stored on Johnston Island were demilitarized, and the agents incinerated at JACADS, with the process completed in year 2000. Later, the destruction of legacy hazardous waste material associated with chemical weapon storage and cleanup was completed. JACADS was demolished by 2003, and the island was stripped of its remaining infrastructure and environmentally remediated.

Closure and remaining structures
In 2003, structures and facilities, including those used in JACADS, were removed, and the runway was marked closed. The last flight out for official personnel was June 15, 2004. After this date, the base was completely deserted, with the only structures left standing being the Joint Operations Center (JOC) building at the east end of the runway, chemical bunkers in the weapon storage area, and at least one Quonset hut.

Built in 1964, the JOC is a four-floor concrete and steel administration building for the island that has no windows and was built to withstand a category IV tropical cyclone as well as atmospheric nuclear tests. The building remains standing but was gutted entirely in 2004, during an asbestos abatement project. All doors of the JOC except one have been welded shut. The ground floor has a side building attached which served as a facility for decontamination that contained three long snaking corridors and 55 shower heads one could walk through during decontamination.

Rows of bunkers in the Red Hat Storage Area remain intact; however, an agreement was established between the U.S. Army and EPA Region IX on August 21, 2003, that the Munitions Demilitarization Building (MDB) at JACADS would be demolished and the bunkers in the RHSA used for disposal of construction rubble and debris. After placement of the debris inside the bunkers, they were secured and the entries blocked with a concrete block barrier (a.k.a. King Tut Block) to prevent access to the bunker interior.

Contamination and cleanup

Over the years, leaks of Agent Orange as well as chemical weapon leaks in the weapon storage area occurred where caustic chemicals such as sodium hydroxide were used to mitigate toxic agents during cleanup. Larger spills of nerve and mustard agent within the MCD at JACADS also took place. Small releases of chemical weapon components from JACADS were cited by the EPA. Multiple studies of the Johnston Atoll environment and ecology have been conducted and the atoll is likely the most studied island in the Pacific.

Studies at the atoll on the impact of PCB contamination in reef damselfish (Abudefduf sordidus) demonstrated that embryonic abnormalities could be used as a metric for comparing contaminated and uncontaminated areas. Some PCB contamination in the lagoon was traced to Coast Guard disposal practices of PCB-laden electrical transformers.

In 1962, plutonium pollution following three failed nuclear missile launches was heaviest near the destroyed launch emplacement, in the lagoon offshore of the launch pad, and near Sand Island. The contaminated launch site was stripped, the debris gathered and buried in the island's 1962 expansion. A comprehensive radiological survey was completed in 1980 to record transuranic contamination remaining from the 1962 THOR missile aborts. The Air Force also initiated research on methods to remove dioxin contamination from soil resulting from leakage of the stored herbicide Agent Orange. Since then, U.S. defense authorities have surveyed the island in a series of studies.

Contaminated structures were dismantled and isolated within the former Thor Launch Emplacement No. 1 (LE-1) as a start for the cleanup program. About 45,000 tons of soil contaminated with radioactive isotopes was collected and placed into a fenced area covering  on the north of the island. The area was known as the Radiological Control Area, and heavily contaminated with highly radioactive Plutonium. The Pluto Yard is on the site of the LE1 where the 1962 missile explosion occurred and also where a highly contaminated loading ramp was buried that was made for loading plutonium contaminated debris onto small boats that was dumped at sea. Remediation included a plutonium "mining" operation called the Johnston Atoll Plutonium Contaminated Soil Cleanup Project. The collected radioactive soil and other debris was buried in a landfill created within the former LE-1 area from June 2002 through November 11, 2002. Remediation at the Radiation Control Area included the construction of a 61-centimeter-thick cap of coral sealing the landfill. Permanent markers were placed at each corner of the landfill to identify the landfill area.

After closing
The atoll was placed up for auction via the U.S. General Services Administration (GSA) in 2005 before it was withdrawn. The stripped Johnston Island was briefly offered for sale with several deed restrictions in 2005 as a "residence or vacation getaway," with potential usage for "eco-tourism" by the GSA's Office of Real Property Utilization and Disposal. The proposed sale included the unique postal zip code 96558, formerly assigned to the Armed Forces in the Pacific. The proposed sale did not include running water, electricity, or activation of the closed runway. The details of the offering were outlined on GSA's website and in a newsletter of the Center for Land Use Interpretation as unusual real estate listing # 6384, Johnston Island.

On August 22, 2006, Johnston Island was struck by Hurricane Ioke. The eastern eye-wall passed directly over the atoll, with winds exceeding . Twelve people were on the island when the hurricane struck, part of a crew sent to the island to deliver a USAF contractor who sampled groundwater contamination levels. All 12 survived and one wrote a first hand account of taking shelter from the storm in the JOC building.

On December 9, 2007, the United States Coast Guard swept the runway at Johnston Island of debris and used the runway in the removal and rescue of an ill Taiwanese fisherman to Oahu, Hawaii. The fisherman was transferred from the Taiwanese fishing vessel Sheng Yi Tsai No. 166 to the Coast Guard buoy tender Kukui on December 6, 2007. The fisherman was transported to the island, and then picked up by a Coast Guard HC-130 Hercules rescue plane from Kodiak, Alaska.

Since the base was closed, the atoll has been visited by many vessels crossing the Pacific, as the deserted atoll has a strong lure due to the activities once performed there. Visitors have blogged about stopping there during a trip, or have posted photos of their visits.

In 2010, a Fish and Wildlife survey team identified a swarm of Anoplolepis ants that had invaded the Johnston Atoll National Wildlife Refuge. The crazy ants threatened vital seabird colonies, and needed to be eradicated. The "Crazy Ant Strike Team" project was led by the U.S. Fish and Wildlife Service, who achieved a 99% reduction in ant numbers by 2013. The team camped in a bunker that was previously used as a fallout shelter and office. Full eradication of the species from the atoll was achieved in 2021.

Demographics

Johnston Atoll has never had any indigenous inhabitants, although during the late part of the 20th century, there were averages of about 300 American military personnel and 1,000 civilian contractors present at any given time. Today it is uninhabited except for a handful of workers with the Crazy Ant Strike Team project, who live on the island for six months at a time with little outside contact.

The primary means of transportation to this island was the airport, which had a paved military runway, or alternatively by ship via a pier and ship channel through the atoll's coral reef system. The islands were wired with 13 outgoing and 10 incoming commercial telephone lines, a 60-channel submarine cable, 22 DSN circuits by satellite, an Autodin with standard remote terminal, a digital telephone switch, the Military Affiliated Radio System (MARS station), a UHF/VHF air-ground radio, and a link to the Pacific Consolidated Telecommunications Network (PCTN) satellite. Amateur radio operators occasionally transmitted from the island, using the KH3 call-sign prefix. The United States Undersea Cable Corporation was awarded contracts to lay underwater cable in the Pacific. A cable known as "Wet Wash C" was laid in 1966 between Makua, Hawaii, and the Johnston Island Air Force Base.  surveyed the route and laid  of cable and 45 repeaters. These cables were manufactured by the Simplex Wire and Cable Company with the repeaters being supplied by Felten and Guilleaume. In 1993 a satellite communication ground station was added to augment the atoll's communications capability.

Johnston Atoll's economic activity was limited to providing services to American military and contractor personnel residing on the island. The island was regularly resupplied by ship or barge, and all foodstuffs and manufactured goods were imported. The base had six 2.5-megawatt electrical generators using diesel engines. The runway was also available to commercial airlines for emergency landings (a fairly common event), and for many years it was a regular stop on Continental Micronesia airline's "island hopper" service between Hawaii and the Marshall Islands.

There were no official license plates issued for use on Johnston Atoll. U.S. government vehicles were issued U.S. government license plates and private vehicles retained the plates from which they were registered. According to reputable license plate collectors, a number of Johnston Atoll license plates were created as souvenirs, and have even been sold online to collectors, but they were not officially issued.

Areas

Launch facilities

See also
List of Guano Island claims

References

External links

 Video from 1923 USS Tanager Expedition Northwestern Hawaiian Islands Multi-Agency Education Project of the University of Hawaii
 "Cleaning up Johnston Atoll" (2005), Plutonium contamination on the Island.
 Johnston Island Memories Site – the personal website of an AFRTS serviceman stationed there in 1975 to 1976
 Coast Guard Medevac from Johnston Island – photo from December 2007 medevac operation
 JACADS – Johnston Atoll Chemical Agent Disposal System – history of nuclear testing, and JACADS Sarin and VX nerve agent disposal
 CyberSarge – Pictorial evidence of chemical weapons disposal
 U.S. Fish & Wildlife Johnston Island National Wildlife Refuge – Contains additional information on wildlife and clean-up efforts
 Mark in the Pacific  (archive version) – website about the end of Johnston Atoll
 Flickr: Laysan at Johnston Island – Photographs of stop-over on abandoned Johnston Atoll in 2012
 The Sovereignty of Guano Islands in the Pacific Ocean, U.S. Department of State Legal Advisor, January 9, 1933. .

 
Pacific Ocean atolls of the United States
United States Minor Outlying Islands
American nuclear test sites
Bird sanctuaries of the United States
Former populated places in Oceania
Geography of Micronesia
Islands of Oceania
Pacific islands claimed under the Guano Islands Act
National Wildlife Refuges in the United States insular areas
Pacific Remote Islands Marine National Monument
Protected areas established in 2009
Uninhabited Pacific islands of the United States
Important Bird Areas of United States Minor Outlying Islands
Important Bird Areas of Oceania
Seabird colonies